The 1973–74 European Cup was the ninth edition of the European Cup, IIHF's premier European club ice hockey tournament. The season started on October 13, 1973 and finished on September 2, 1975.

The tournament was won by CSKA Moscow, who beat Tesla Pardubice in the final.

First round

Second round

Third round

Semifinals

 CSKA Moscow  :  bye

Finals

References 
 Season 1974

1
IIHF European Cup